100% Tierra Caliente is the title of a studio album released by Regional Mexican band, Beto y sus Canarios on January 27, 2004. This album includes the hit single "Está Llorando Mi Corazón," which won the award for Regional Mexican Airplay of the Year by a Male Group at the 2005 Latin Billboard Music Awards.

It comprises fifteen tracks with different rhythms, such as rancheras, cumbias,  and ballads.
The album sold nearly 200,000 copies.

Track listing 
The information from AllMusic.

Chart performance

References

Spanish-language albums
2004 albums
Beto y sus Canarios albums
Tierra Caliente albums